García de Santa María Mendoza y Zúñiga (died 1606) was a Spanish Catholic prelate who served as the Archbishop of Mexico (1600–1606).

Biography
García de Santa María Mendoza y Zúñiga was ordained a priest in the Order of Saint Jerome. On December 6, 1600, he was appointed by Pope Clement VIII as Archbishop of Mexico. On August 15, 1601, he was consecrated bishop by Cardinal Bernardo de Sandoval y Rojas, Archbishop of Toledo. He served as Archbishop of Mexico until his death in 1606. While bishop, he was the principal consecrator of Diego Vázquez de Mercado, Bishop of Yucatán (1604).

References

1606 deaths
17th-century Roman Catholic archbishops in Mexico
Spanish Roman Catholic bishops in North America
Bishops appointed by Pope Clement VIII
Hieronymite bishops